The Poljane Upper Secondary School is located in Ljubljana, the capital of Slovenia. It is a coeducational nondenominational state secondary general education school for students aged between 15 and 19. It prepares them for university, which they can enroll at after passing the matura (leaving exam).

History
The Poljane Upper Secondary School was founded in 1889 as a lower secondary school with German as the language of instruction. Its initial name was "Second State Gymnasium". In 1900, it was expanded to include 15- to 19-year-olds as well. In the present building classes started in 1907. In 1918 the building was renovated and German was replaced by Slovene as the language of instruction. By 1921, the Poljane Grammar School was the largest secondary school in Slovenia. Several school reforms changed the curriculum and the name of the school. These names included "Upper Secondary School No. 2", "Upper Secondary School No. 5", and "Vida Janežič Upper Secondary School" (the last name refers to the Communist-era hero Vida Janežič, 1914-1944). In 1990 the school was renamed the Poljane Upper Secondary School.

Main characteristics
The school's curriculum consists of two programs: the general program and the classical program, in which one of the foreign languages is Latin. A change introduced three years ago is European classes, in which the general program incorporates the latest trends: project approach, authentic interdisciplinary learning, team teaching of foreign languages with the aim of increasing the intercultural competence of students.

The Poljane Upper Secondary School offers its students the possibility to choose among a broad range of foreign languages. All students in school study at least two foreign languages, some study three or even four. In addition to English or German as the first foreign language (starting at an intermediate level), they can pick one or two at a beginner level, choosing from German, French, Spanish, Italian, Russian and Classical Greek in the classical program. The second foreign language is studied for all four years, the third one for two or three. In the classical program, Latin is a compulsory subject with a focal role in the curriculum.

Quality of education
There are very few, if any, dropouts, and the academic performance of students is very good. This is shown annually in the results of the leaving exam. Every year, the average results of students are high above the national average, and the number of students who pass with distinction is among the highest in the country.

Notable people 
Notable instructors:
, author and literary historian
Božidar Jakac, painter
, prelate, bishop of Trieste
France Koblar, art historian
Ferdo Kozak, author and politician
Juš Kozak, writer
Dragutin Mate, diplomat and politician
Simon Rutar, historian
Oton Župančič, poet
Fran Zwitter, historian

Notable alumni:
Bojan Adamič, composer and photographer
, sports commentator
Alenka Gotar, singer
Tamara Griesser Pečar, historian
Zoran Janković, manager and politician, mayor of Ljubljana
Zmago Jelinčič Plemeniti, politician
Taras Kermauner, literary historian, philosopher and essayist
Ernst Mally, Austrian philosopher
Vasilij Melik, historian
Boris A. Novak, author
Alenka Puhar, journalist, author, and human rights activist
Vasko Simoniti, historian and politician
Matjaž Šinkovec, diplomat and politician
Gregor Strniša, poet
Igor Torkar, writer
Vladimir Truhlar, poet and theologian
Dane Zajc, poet and playwright

External links
official site of the Poljane Upper Secondary School

Secondary schools in Slovenia
Schools in Ljubljana
Educational institutions established in 1889
1889 establishments in Austria-Hungary